The Rolling Hills Conference was a small-school high school athletic conference in west central Iowa. All of the schools in the conference competed in Class 1A, the smallest in the state.

Final members

History
The Rolling Hills Conference was organized in the late 1970s. Original members were Walnut, Elk Horn–Kimballton, Anita, Cumberland-Massena, Bridgewater–Fontanelle, Adair–Casey, Orient-Macksburg, and Exira. They were soon joined by Shelby-Tennant and Carson-Macedonia. Carson-Macedonia left for the Corner Conference in 1986.  Anita and Cumberland-Massena merged to become CAM in 1989. Shelby-Tennant left when they merged with AvoHa of Avoca in 1991. Bridgewater–Fontanelle did likewise when they merged with Greenfield in 1993. In 2004, Earlham, who had joined the conference in the late 1990s, left the league to join the West Central Activities Conference, a league covering similar territory that contains larger 1A and smaller 2A schools. Ankeny Christian Academy joined the conference in 2005. The school had only recently started its athletic program and the Rolling Hills was its first conference. In 2007, Paton-Churdan, the smallest school in the West Central Activities Conference, became a member of the Rolling Hills, and in 2009 Glidden-Ralston followed them there. In 2010, East Greene became the third West Central Activities Conference school to jump to the Rolling Hills in the last 4 years, with both Exira and Elk Horn Kimballton sharing in sports at the starts in 2010.

The conference was dissolved after the 2012–13 school year.

References

External links
 Paton-Churdan guide to the conference
Official site

High school sports in Iowa
2013 disestablishments in Iowa
Defunct sports leagues in the United States